Cecilia Della Peruti, better known by her stage name Gothic Tropic, is an American singer-songwriter and multi-instrumentalist from Plainfield, New Jersey. Gothic Tropic released their first EP, Awesome Problems, in 2011 and released their debut studio album, Fast or Feast, on May 19, 2017. They are most known for their single “Stronger" That was added to JJJ Radio in Australia and charted at over 60 stations across the United States.

Life and career

Early life and career

Born to parents Juliana Gondek, a Polish opera singer and pedagogue at UCLA, and Carl Della Peruti, an Italian jazz composer and trombone player, music has always been a strong influence in Della Peruti's life. [http://www.garrettleight.com/stories/mixtapes/mixtape-no-30-gothic-tropic/ She pursued visual art before dedicating her time to making music professionally.

As a high school freshman, Cecilia started her first project, The Cheats. Based out of drummer and co-writer Kirk Podell's parents' Los Feliz garage, they frequented the Hollywood Knitting Factory and various DIY venues opening for punk acts like Dr. Know and The Dickies throughout 2004–2006. Fresh out of high school, Della Peruti was asked to perform on Rumspringa's debut full-length album, ‘Sway’ leading to a full time guitarist and vocalist position in the band from 2009 to 2011. Della Peruti began working professionally as a featured commercial talent and voice actor, and performed on Hit Record TV with Joseph Gordon Levitt, Google's Pixel campaign directed by Autumn de Wilde, Gucci's MySpace campaign, US Bank Tour Series, Pure Gear and more.

Della Peruti has cut her teeth as a multi-instrumentalist touring player for Beck, Børns and Charli XCX. Following the release of ‘Fast or Feast’, Cecilia was invited to join Beck in his touring band on vocals, guitar, and percussion. Della Peruti has won sponsorships with leading gear manufacturers, and is featured as one of six guitarists in Fender's American Professional Series campaign, alongside legends like Charlie Bereal and Duff Mckagan.

Gothic Tropic's new music has been attracting international media appeal from Beats 1's Zane Lowe, KROQ's Kat Corbett, to Australia's Triple J, as well as having been added to many major front page Spotify and Apple Music playlists. After having supported Kate Nash on her recent UK tour, as well as packing out her first UK and EU headline tour and festival circuit, Gothic Tropic is bound for "slick, full arenas."

Awesome Problems EP (2011 - 2017)

‘Awesome Problems’ marks the debut of Della Peruti releasing her solo material under her stage name, Gothic Tropic. The EP was recorded live with drummer Liv Marsico, bassist Daniel Denton, and guitarist Samuel Lopez Jr. and was mixed by Mark Rains at Station House Studio.

Fast or Feast Album (2017 - present)

‘Fast or Feast’ explores themes of empowerment, where strength is found in the times of vulnerability. Rising from the ashes of old relationships and the difficulties of growing up, Gothic Tropic's new record skillfully and wittily riffs on such universal experiences. 
For Della Peruti, the title of her new album came from a place of paradoxical brutality. “I felt it personified the extreme conditions of the writing and recording process, as well as where I'm at in my life. The chances of becoming homeless or renting a jet are somehow equal”, she muses. From one extreme to another ‘Fast or Feast’ captures the spirit of Della Peruti's artistry that triumphantly mixes shimmering pop with psych and classic rock. Recorded in Echo Park in spring of 2016 with Todd Dahlhoff, ‘Fast or Feast’ was the result of a two-year period writing on the road while playing for Børns. Accordingly, the patchworked way of writing and recording influenced Della Peruti's “sense of freedom to create a wide variety of music, while all belonging to the same family”

Discography

Studio albums
 Fast or Feast (Old Flame Records, 2017)

EPs
 Awesome Problems EP (Self Released, 2011)
 Tang Brain (Dome Of Doom, 2021)

Singles
Underwater Games (non-album single, 2014)
Bird of Prey (non-album single, 2014)	
Puppet Master (non-album single, 2015)

References 

1989 births
Living people
People from Plainfield, New Jersey
American people of Italian descent
American people of Polish descent